Kinphonic is a UK based record label, founded in 2015 by Tommie Keeston. It also specializes in bookings, publishing, record distribution, management, merchandise and graphic design.

Sub-labels 
The following labels are owned or licensed by Kinphonic.
 KINFree
 FIRSTOFF

Discography

Kinphonic

KINFree

FIRSTOFF

Albums

See also

 List of record labels
 List of independent UK record labels

References

British record labels
Record labels established in 2015